Rutunium was a former Roman settlement at the site of Harcourt Park, Shropshire, in the United Kingdom. It appeared in the Antonine Itinerary.

References

Former populated places in Shropshire
Roman sites in England